Blood Wedding is a 1977 Moroccan drama film directed by Souheil Ben-Barka. The film was selected as the Moroccan entry for Best Foreign Language Film at the 50th Academy Awards, but was not accepted as a nominee. The film is based on the Spanish play by Federico Garcia Lorca.

Cast
 Irene Papas as La mère
 Laurent Terzieff as Amrouch
 Djamila as La fiancée
 Mohamed El Habachi as Le fiancé
 Doghmi Larbi as La père
 Muni as La servante
 Souad Jalil as La femme d'Amrouch
 Naima Lamcharki as La folle
 Mohamed El Baz as Le berger
 Izza Gennini as La voisine

See also
 List of submissions to the 50th Academy Awards for Best Foreign Language Film
 List of Moroccan submissions for the Academy Award for Best Foreign Language Film

References

External links
 

1977 films
1970s French-language films
1977 drama films
Moroccan drama films